Yoiver González Mosquera (born 22 November 1989) is a Colombian footballer who plays as a defender for Categoría Primera A club Deportivo Pereira.

González is a product of the Millonarios youth system and played with the Millonarios first team since November, 2007.

International career
During his loan in Fortaleza, González was partner of Rolan de la Cruz, a Colombian footballer who was already naturalized to play for Equatorial Guinea, who invited him and helped him to join the Equatoguinean team.

On 21 March 2013, González made a non-recognized-by-FIFA appearance with Equatorial Guinea, in a friendly against the Beninese national team that was made up of local-based players, as the senior Benin national team was conducting a preparatory stage in Marseille, France, ahead of their match against Algeria. He was camouflaged by the Equatoguinean official press as Zeiver Gonzales Ondo. He was also called up to face Cape Verde Islands as part of the 2014 FIFA World Cup qualifying campaign, but did not enter in the match by an ankle problem.

References

External links
Yoiver González at BDFA.com.ar 

1989 births
Living people
Sportspeople from Cauca Department
Colombian footballers
Association football defenders
Categoría Primera A players
Millonarios F.C. players
Deportivo Pasto footballers
Deportivo Pereira footballers
Categoría Primera B players
Fortaleza C.E.I.F. footballers
América de Cali footballers
Gaziantepspor footballers
Colombian expatriate footballers
Colombian expatriate sportspeople in Turkey
Expatriate footballers in Turkey